It's Bruno! is an American comedy streaming television series created by Solvan Naim that premiered on Netflix on May 17, 2019. The series stars Naim, Rob Morgan and Shakira Barrera. It's Bruno! follows the story of "a man and his beloved puggle dog, Bruno, as they stroll through the streets of Bushwick, Brooklyn." Bruno stars as himself, while Bruno's owner Malcolm is played by Naim.

In 2019, the series was nominated for Outstanding Short Form Comedy or Drama Series at the 71st Primetime Creative Arts Emmy Awards.

Cast and characters
 Bruno as himself
 Solvan Naim as Malcolm Bartello
 Rob Morgan as Harvey
 Shakira Barrera as Lulu 
 Johnnie Mae as Maureen
 Joe Perrino as Mario
 Donnell Rawlings as Carl
 Eden Marryshow as Chris
 Jade Eshete as Rosa
 Sam Eliad as Charlie 
 Omar Scroggins as TJ
 Adriane Lenox as Jizzel
 Kathiamarice Lopez as Leslie 
 Devale Ellis as Nelson
 Eddie J. Hernandez as Billy Bailando
 Anthony L. Fernandez as Barry
 Anthony Valderrama as Cuban Tone
 Katie Rich as Ranger Debecki
 David Lee Denny, Jr. as Parent #1

Episodes

Production

Development
On April 11, 2019, it was announced that Netflix had given the production a series order for an eight-episode first season. The series was created by Solvan Naim, who stars and executive produces. Production companies involved with the series were slated to consist of Stage 13, SLI Entertainment and Phiphen Pictures.

Casting
Alongside the series order announcement, it was confirmed that Solvan Naim, Rob Morgan and Shakira Barrera would star in the series.

Filming
Principal photography for the first season took place in Ridgewood, Queens, New York in 2018.

Reception

Critical response
The review aggregator website Rotten Tomatoes reported a 100% approval rating for the first season with an average rating of 7.5/10, based on 5 reviews.

Release

Marketing 
On May 3, 2019, the official trailer for the series was released.

References

External links
 
 

2010s American comedy-drama television series
2019 American television series debuts
English-language Netflix original programming
Television shows set in New York City